Our Lady of Perpetual Exemption was a legally recognized church in the United States, established by comedian and satirist John Oliver. Its purpose was to expose and ridicule televangelists such as Robert Tilton and Creflo Dollar who preach the "prosperity gospel", seen as a way to defraud believers of their money, and to draw attention to the tax-exempt status given to churches and charities with little government oversight. Oliver announced formation of his church on March 31, 2015, in a twenty-minute segment on his show Last Week Tonight.

Oliver announced that the Church would be shutting down during his show on September 13, 2015. All donations were forwarded to Doctors Without Borders.

In June 2021, Oliver set up a healthcare sharing ministry (HCSM) in Florida called Our Lady of Perpetual Health, satirizing what HCSMs are allowed to do by law, essentially having no obligation to provide any care.

Creation

Oliver established his church as a legal entity, partly to demonstrate that it is "disturbingly easy", in terms of paperwork, to set up a tax-exempt religious organization as viewed by the Internal Revenue Service (IRS).  As Oliver explained, the definition of "church" is quite broad. Oliver chose his New York City studio for the church's official location, but he registered the nonprofit organization in the state of Texas. Oliver's "megachurch" used a toll-free phone number to permit callers to donate to the church, and said that donations would be redistributed to the charitable relief organization Doctors Without Borders upon the church's dissolution.  During the satirical infomercial part of the episode, comedian Rachel Dratch appeared as John Oliver's "wife" Wanda Jo Oliver; she later reprised the role in additional segments about the church, and again appeared as Wanda Jo on April 8, 2018, in a sketch about crisis pregnancy centers. She also appeared on February 24, 2019, as a psychic medium, with a new accent, as well as once more on June 25, 2021, reprising again her role in the "Our Lady of Perpetual Health" HCSM.

Oliver criticized the practices of televangelists such as Kenneth Copeland and Robert Tilton as predatory, seeking donations from distressed people with promises of curing sickness through prayer, or of helping people of marginal means get out of credit card debt, by sending cash through the mail. In his broadcast on August 16, Oliver revealed letters of his months-long correspondence with Tilton, in which Oliver sent cash through the mail, only to receive more solicitations from Tilton, with nothing substantial in return. Oliver criticized pastors such as Tilton, Copeland and his wife Gloria, Creflo Dollar, and others for "taking advantage of the open-ended IRS definition of the word 'church' and procuring a litany of tax breaks", according to a report in the Washington Post.

Response 
In response to the episode, viewers of Last Week Tonight sent in $70,000, including other items such as a custom-made shirt, a variety of different packages of seeds as well as semen (in reference to the "seed faith" gospel the show was parodying), international currency, a four-foot wooden statue of a penis, among other items.
Callers to the toll-free number would hear a pre-recorded message from Oliver demanding donations. People who mailed in donations received a letter in return, thanking them and requesting additional money in return for blessings. These were satirizing the correspondence between Oliver and Robert Tilton.

All cash donations were given to Doctors Without Borders.

Reaction 
Critic Matt Wilstein, writing in Mediaite, saw Oliver's stunt as being along the same lines as comedian Stephen Colbert's setting up of a 501(c)(4)—Colbert Super PAC—as a way to "test the absurd limits of the Supreme Court's Citizens United decision"; Oliver's megachurch, in contrast, is a way to test whether the IRS might view his "megachurch" as a tax-exempt organization. Critic Steve Thorngate, writing in The Christian Century, suggested that the question of the religious exemption from taxation was more difficult and nuanced than Oliver portrayed, and not a simple matter of government regulation, describing Oliver's pivot to IRS policy as "unhelpful". However, Thorngate agreed that Oliver's exposure and criticism of "manipulative sleazeballs" who "fleece the faithful" is "spot-on". Critic Leonardo Blair, writing in The Christian Post, described Oliver's segment as a "brutal takedown" of televangelists and churches which preach "the prosperity gospel", a message that dupes people into thinking that cash donations will solve medical or financial problems, while in fact the donations go to the personal aggrandizement of televangelists who buy expensive jets or large mansions.

A week after the announcement of the church's creation, Oliver devoted a short segment of his show to the donations the church had received, which included money from around the world. Oliver said he had received "thousands of envelopes with thousands of dollars" from donors. Several US Post Office containers full of mail were displayed. Oliver told viewers that the more money they sent in, the more "blessings" would be returned to them, adding that "that is still something I'm—amazingly—legally allowed to say".

Dissolution 
On September 13, 2015, Our Lady of Perpetual Exemption was shut down by Oliver. While Oliver made it clear that the church preferred monetary donations, Oliver claimed that supporters sent actual bags of seeds, and what appeared to be containers of sperm. (This was presumably in response to the satirized "seed faith" in which donations are referred to as "seeds".) Rachel Dratch (playing Oliver's wife) joked in response, "...when someone sends you jizz through the mail, it's time to stop whatever you're doing".

Upon the church's dissolution, Oliver announced that the tens of thousands of dollars received to date would be donated to Doctors Without Borders, and mockingly said that "if you want to send money to a fake church, send it to Scientology".

See also 

 List of religious ideas in science fiction
 Free church
 Loophole
 Parody religion
 Religion and politics in the United States
 Religious satire
 Tax status of Scientology in the United States
 Tithe

References

External links
 Official website showing "closed" message (archived July 3, 2021)
 Last Week Tonight with John Oliver: Season 2 Episode 45 on HBO
 Ep. 49 Clip: Televangelists on HBO
 
Copy of the mailer sent out by Our Lady of Perpetual Exemption

2015 disestablishments in New York (state)
2015 disestablishments in Texas
2015 establishments in New York City
2015 establishments in Texas
2015 in religion
Charity law
Churches in Texas
Investigative journalism
Parodies of televangelism
Law about religion in the United States
Religious organizations established in 2015
Religious organizations disestablished in 2015
Last Week Tonight with John Oliver
Satire